Child sacrifice is the ritualistic killing of children in order to please or appease a deity, supernatural beings, or sacred social order, tribal, group or national loyalties in order to achieve a desired result. As such, it is a form of human sacrifice.
Child sacrifice is thought to be an extreme extension of the idea that the more important the object of sacrifice, the more devout the person rendering it.

The practice of child sacrifice in Europe and the Near East appears to have ended as a part of the religious transformations of late antiquity.

Pre-Columbian cultures

Archaeologists have found the remains of more than 140 children who were sacrificed in Peru's northern coastal region.

Aztec culture

Archeologists have found remains of 42 children. It is alleged that these remains were sacrificed to Tlaloc (and a few to Ehécatl, Quetzalcoatl and Huitzilopochtli) in the offerings of the Great Pyramid of Tenochtitlan by the Aztecs of pre-Columbian Mexico. In every case, the 42 children, mostly males aged around six, were suffering from serious cavities, abscesses or bone infections that would have been painful enough to make them cry continually. Tlaloc required the tears of the young so their tears would wet the earth.  As a result, if children did not cry, the priests would sometimes tear off the children's nails before the ritual sacrifice.

Human sacrifice was an everyday activity in Tenochtitlan and women and children were not exempt. According to Bernardino de Sahagún, the Aztecs believed that, if sacrifices were not given to Tlaloc, the rain would not come and their crops would not grow.

Inca culture
The Inca culture sacrificed children in a ritual called qhapaq hucha. Their frozen corpses have been discovered in the South American mountaintops. The first of these corpses, a female child who had died from a blow to the skull, was discovered in 1995 by Johan Reinhard. Other methods of sacrifice included strangulation and simply leaving the children, who had been given an intoxicating drink, to lose consciousness in the extreme cold and low-oxygen conditions of the mountaintop, and to die of hypothermia.

Maya culture 
In Maya culture, people believed that supernatural beings had power over their lives and this is one reason that child sacrifice occurred. The sacrifices were essentially to satisfy the supernatural beings. This was done through k'ex, which is an exchange or substitution of something. Through k'ex infants would substitute more powerful humans. It was thought that supernatural beings would consume the souls of more powerful humans and infants were substituted in order to prevent that. Infants are believed to be good offerings because they have a close connection to the spirit world through liminality. It is also believed that parents in Maya culture would offer their children for sacrifice and depictions of this show that this was a very emotional time for the parents, but they would carry through because they thought the child would continue existing. It is also known that infant sacrifices occurred at certain times. Child sacrifice was preferred when there was a time of crisis and transitional times such as famine and drought.

There is archaeological evidence of infant sacrifice in tombs where the infant has been buried in urns or ceramic vessels. There have also been depictions of child sacrifice in art. Some art includes pottery and steles as well as references to infant sacrifice in mythology and art depictions of the mythology.

Moche culture

The Moche of northern Peru practiced mass sacrifices of men and boys. Archeologists found the remains of 137 children and 3 adults, along with 200 camelids, during excavations in 2011, 2014 and 2016, beneath the sands of a 15th-century site called Huanchaquito-Las Llamas. This sacrifice was possibly made during the heavy rains as there was a layer of mud on top of the clean sand.

Timoto-Cuica culture
The Timoto-Cuicas offered human sacrifices. Until colonial times children sacrifice persisted secretly in Laguna de Urao (Mérida). It was described by the chronicler Juan de Castellanos, who cited that feasts and human sacrifices were done in honour of Icaque, an Andean prehispanic goddess.

Ancient Near East

Tanakh
The Tanakh mentions human sacrifice in the history of ancient Near Eastern practice. The king of Moab gives his firstborn son and heir as a whole burnt offering (olah, as used of the Temple sacrifice). In the book of the prophet Micah, the question is asked, 'Shall I give my firstborn for my sin, the fruit of my body for the sin of my soul?', and responded to in the phrase, 'He has shown all you people what is good. And what does Yahweh require of you? To act justly and to love mercy and to walk humbly with your God.' The Tanakh also implies that the Ammonites offered child sacrifices to Moloch.

According to scholars such as Otto Eissfeldt, Paul G. Mosca, and Susan Ackerman, Moloch was not a name for a god, but instead is a word for a particular form of child sacrifice practiced in Israel and Judah which was not abandoned until the reforms of Josiah. In the Tanakh mentions are made in books such as Kings, Leviticus, and Jeremiah of children being given "to the mōlek". According to Patrick D. Miller these child sacrifice traditions were not originally part of the Yahwism, but were instead foreign imports. Francesca Stavrakopoulou contradicts this asserting that sacrifices were native to Israel and part of the royal line's attempts to perpetuate itself.

 states "The firstborn of your sons you shall give to me" potentially a demand by Yahweh that the firstborn children of the Israelites must be sacrificed to him. However, Yahweh forbids human sacrifice and, as in the Day of Atonement, Yahweh instituted substitutionary animal sacrifices for human sin and the redemption of the firstborn in Israelite families (Exodus 13:11-16). Yahweh also states to the prophet Jeremiah, “They have built the high places of Topheth in the Valley of Ben Hinnom to burn their sons and daughters in the fire—something I did not command, nor did it enter my mind,” (Jeremiah 7:31) indicating that it was viewed as an antithesis to the law and desire of Yahweh.

Binding of Isaac

Genesis 22 relates the binding of Isaac, by Abraham to present his son, Isaac, as a sacrifice on Mount Moriah. It was a test of faith (Genesis 22:12). Abraham agrees to this command without arguing. The story ends with an angel stopping Abraham at the last minute and making Isaac's sacrifice unnecessary by providing a ram, caught in some nearby bushes, to be sacrificed instead. Later interpretations of the text have contradicted this version.  For example, Martin S. Bergmann states "The Aggadah rabbis asserted that "father Isaac was bound on the altar and reduced to ashes, and his sacrificial dust was cast on  Mount Moriah." A similar interpretation was made in the Epistle to the Hebrews. Margaret Barker notes that "Abraham returned to Bersheeba without Isaac" according to  a possible sign that he was indeed sacrificed.  Barker also notes that wall paintings in the ancient Dura-Europos synagogue explicitly show Isaac being sacrificed, followed by his soul traveling to heaven. According to Jon D. Levenson a part of Jewish tradition interpreted Isaac as having been sacrificed. Similarly the German theologians  and  maintain that due to the grammatical perfect tense used to describe Abraham's sacrifice of Isaac, he did, in fact, follow through with the action.

Rabbi A.I. Kook, first Chief Rabbi of Israel, stressed that the climax of the story, commanding Abraham not to sacrifice Isaac, is the whole point: to put an end to, and God's total aversion to the ritual of child sacrifice.  According to Irving Greenberg the story of the binding of Isaac, symbolizes the prohibition to worship God by human sacrifices, at a time when human sacrifices were the norm worldwide.

Ban in Leviticus

In Leviticus 18:21, 20:3 and Deuteronomy 12:30–31, 18:10, the Torah contains a number of imprecations against and laws forbidding child sacrifice and human sacrifice in general. The Tanakh denounces human sacrifice as barbaric customs of Baal worshippers (e.g. Psalms 106:37).
James Kugel argues that the Torah's specifically forbidding child sacrifice indicates that it happened in Israel as well. The biblical scholar Mark S. Smith argues that the mention of "Tophet" in Isaiah 30:27–33 indicates an acceptance of child sacrifice in the early Jerusalem practices, to which the law in Leviticus 20:2–5 forbidding child sacrifice is a response. Some scholars have stated that at least some Israelites and Judahites believed child sacrifice was a legitimate religious practice.

Numbers 31
In the aftermath of the War against the Midianites narrated in Numbers 31, the Israelites appear to be dedicating 32 captive Midianite virgin girls to be sacrificed to Yahweh as his share in the spoils of war.

Gehenna and Tophet

The most extensive accounts of child sacrifice in the Hebrew Bible refer to those carried out in Gehenna by two kings of Judah, Ahaz and Manasseh of Judah.

Jephthah's daughter

In the Book of Judges, chapter 11, the figure of Jephthah makes a vow to God, saying, "If you give the Ammonites into my hands, whatever comes out of the door of my house to meet me when I return in triumph from the Ammonites will be the Lord’s, and I will sacrifice it as a burnt offering" (as worded in the New International Version). Jephthah succeeds in winning a victory, but when he returns to his home in Mizpah he sees his daughter, dancing to the sound of timbrels, outside.  After allowing her two months preparation, Judges 11:39 states that Jephthah kept his vow. According to the commentators of the rabbinic Jewish tradition, Jepthah's daughter was not sacrificed but was forbidden to marry and remained a spinster her entire life, fulfilling the vow that she would be devoted to the Lord. The 1st-century CE Jewish historian Flavius Josephus, however, understood this to mean that Jephthah burned his daughter on Yahweh's altar, whilst pseudo-Philo, late first century CE, wrote that Jephthah offered his daughter as a burnt offering because he could find no sage in Israel who would cancel his vow. In other words, this story of human sacrifice is not an order or requirement by God, but the punishment for those who vowed to sacrifice humans.

Phoenicia and Carthage

The practice of child sacrifice among Canaanite groups is attested by numerous sources spanning over a millennium. One example is in the writings of Diodorus Siculus:

"They also alleged that Kronos had turned against them inasmuch as in former times they had been accustomed to sacrifice to this god the noblest of their sons, but more recently, secretly buying and nurturing children, they had sent these to the sacrifice; and when an investigation was made, some of those who had been sacrificed were discovered to have been substituted by stealth... In their zeal to make amends for the omission, they selected two hundred of the noblest children and sacrificed them publicly; and others who were under suspicion sacrificed themselves voluntarily, in number not less than three hundred. There was in the city a bronze image of Kronos, extending its hands, palms up and sloping towards the ground, so that each of the children when placed thereon rolled down and fell into a sort of gaping pit filled with fire. It is probable that it was from this that Euripides has drawn the mythical story found in his works about the sacrifice in Tauris, in which he presents Iphigeneia being asked by Orestes: "But what tomb shall receive me when I die? A sacred fire within, and earth's broad rift." Also the story passed down among the Greeks from ancient myth that Cronus did away with his own children appears to have been kept in mind among the Carthaginians through this observance." Library 20.1.4

Plutarch:

"Again, would it not have been far better for the Carthaginians to have taken Critias or Diagoras to draw up their law-code at the very beginning, and so not to believe in any divine power or god, rather than to offer such sacrifices as they used to offer to Cronos? These were not in the manner that Empedocles describes in his attack on those who sacrifice living creatures: "Changed in form is the son beloved of his father so pious,Who on the altar lays him and slays him. What folly!" No, but with full knowledge and understanding they themselves offered up their own children, and those who had no children would buy little ones from poor people and cut their throats as if they were so many lambs or young birds; meanwhile the mother stood by without a tear or moan; but should she utter a single moan or let fall a single tear, she had to forfeit the money, and her child was sacrificed nevertheless; and the whole area before the statue was filled with a loud noise of flutes and drums so that the cries of wailing should not reach the ears of the people." Moralia 2, De Superstitione 3

Plato:

"With us, for instance, human sacrifice is not legal, but unholy, whereas the Carthaginians perform it as a thing they account holy and legal, and that too when some of them sacrifice even their own sons to Cronos, as I daresay you yourself have heard." (Minos 315)

Theophrastus:

"And from then on to the present day they perform human sacrifices with the participation of all, not only in Arcadia during the Lykaia and in Carthage to Kronos, but also periodically, in remembrance of the customary usage, they spill the blood of their own kin on the altars, even though the divine law among them bars from the rites, by means of perirrhanteria and the herald's proclamation, anyone responsible for the shedding of blood in peacetime."

Sophocles:

For from ancient times the barbarians have had a custom of sacrificing human beings to Kronos."

Quintus Curtius Rufus:

"Some even proposed renewing a sacrifice which had been discontinued for many years, and which I for my part should believe to be by no means pleasing to the gods, of offering a freeborn boy to Saturn —this sacrilege rather than sacrifice, handed down from their founders, the Carthaginians are said to have performed until the destruction of their city—and unless the elders, in accordance with whose counsel everything was done, had opposed it, the awful superstition would have prevailed over mercy. But necessity, more inventive than any art, introduced not only the usual means of defence, but also some novel ones." History of Alexander IV.III.23

Tertullian:

"In Africa infants used to be sacrificed to Saturn, and quite openly, down to the proconsulate of Tiberius, who took the priests themselves and on the very trees of their temple, under whose shadow their crimes had been committed, hung them alive like votive offerings on crosses; and the soldiers of my own country are witnesses to it, who served that proconsul in that very task. Yes, and to this day that holy crime persists in secret." Apology 9.2-3

Philo of Byblos:

"Among ancient peoples in critically dangerous situations it was customary for the rulers of a city or nation, rather than lose everyone, to provide the dearest of their children as a propitiatory sacrifice to the avenging deities. The children thus given up were slaughtered according to a secret ritual. Now Kronos, whom the Phoenicians call El, who was in their land and who was later divinized after his death as the star of Kronos, had an only son by a local bride named Anobret, and therefore they called him Ieoud. Even now among the Phoenicians the only son is given this name. When war’s gravest dangers gripped the land, Kronos dressed his son in royal attire, prepared an altar and sacrificed him."

Lucian:

"There is another form of sacrifice here. After putting a garland on the sacrificial animals they hurl them down alive from the gateway and the animals die from the fall. Some even throw their children off the place, but not in the same manner as the animals. Instead, having laid them in a pallet, they drop them down by hand. At the same time they mock them and say that they are oxen, not children."

Cleitarchus:

"And Kleitarchos says the Phoenicians, and above all the Carthaginians, venerating Kronos, whenever they were eager for a great thing to succeed, made a vow by one of their children. If they would receive the desired things, they would sacrifice it to the god. A bronze Kronos, having been erected by them, stretched out upturned hands over a bronze oven to burn the child. The flame of the burning child reached its body until, the limbs having shriveled up and the smiling mouth appearing to be almost laughing, it would slip into the oven. Therefore the grin is called “sardonic laughter,” since they die laughing."

Porphyry:

"The Phoenicians too, in great disasters whether of wars or droughts, or plagues, used to sacrifice one of their dearest, dedicating him to Kronos. And the ‘Phoenician History,’ which Sanchuniathon wrote in Phoenician and which Philo of Byblos translated into Greek in eight books, is full of such sacrifices."

And in the Books of Kings:

"When the king of Moab saw that the battle had gone against him, he took with him seven hundred swordsmen to break through to the king of Edom, but they failed. Then he took his firstborn son, who was to succeed him as king, and offered him as a sacrifice on the city wall. The fury against Israel was great; they withdrew and returned to their own land." (2 Kings 3:26-27)

At Carthage, a large cemetery exists that combines the bodies of both very young children and small animals, and those who assert child sacrifice have argued that if the animals were sacrificed, then so too were the children. Recent archaeology, however, has produced a detailed breakdown of the ages of the buried children and, based on this and especially on the presence of prenatal individuals – that is, still births – it is also argued that this site is consistent with burials of children who had died of natural causes in a society that had a high infant mortality rate, as Carthage is assumed to have had. That is, the data support the view that Tophets were cemeteries for those who died shortly before or after birth. Conversely, Patricia Smith and colleagues from the Hebrew University and Harvard University show from the teeth and skeletal analysis at the Carthage Tophet that infant ages at death (about two months) do not correlate with the expected ages of natural mortality (perinatal), apparently supporting the child sacrifice thesis.

Greek, Roman and Israelite writers refer to Phoenician child sacrifice. Skeptics suggest that the bodies of children found in Carthaginian and Phoenician cemeteries were merely the cremated remains of children that died naturally. Sergio Ribichini has argued that the Tophet was "a child necropolis designed to receive the remains of infants who had died prematurely of sickness or other natural causes, and who for this reason were "offered" to specific deities and buried in a place different from the one reserved for the ordinary dead".

According to Stager and Wolff, in 1984, there was a consensus among scholars that Carthaginian children were sacrificed by their parents, who would make a vow to kill the next child if the gods would grant them a favor: for instance that their shipment of goods was to arrive safely in a foreign port.

Pre-Islamic Arabia
The Quran documents pagan Arabians sacrificing their children to idols.

Europe
Archaeologist Peter Warren was involved in the British School at Athens excavation of Palekastro for one season and the excavation at Lefkandi for two seasons. Then he led the excavation at Fournou Korifi, Myrtos from 1967 to 1968. During the 1980s, in two archology magazines, Warren wrote about "child sacrifice" despite the no mention when the official excavation report was completed and published along with his book in 1972. 

Rodney Castleden uncovered a sanctuary near Knossos where the remains of a 17-year-old were found.

The Ver Sacrum is a religious practice of ancient Italic peoples, especially the Sabelli (or Sabini) and their offshoot Samnites. The practice is related to that of devotio in Roman religion. It was customary to resort to it at times of particular danger or strife for the community. Some scholars believe that in earlier times devoted or vowed children were actually sacrificed, but later expulsion was substituted. Dionysius of Halicarnassus states the practice of child sacrifice was one of the causes that brought about the fall of the Pelasgians in Italy.

The human children who had been devoted were required to leave the community in early adulthood, at 20 or 21 years of age. They were entrusted to a god for protection, and led to the border with a veiled face. Often they were led by an animal under the auspices of the god. As a group, the youth were called sacrani and were supposed to enjoy the protection of Mars until they had reached their destination, expelled the inhabitants or forced them into submission, and founded their own settlement. The Waldensians, a medieval sect deemed heretical, were accused of participating in child sacrifice.

Africa

South Africa

The continued murder of black children of all ages, for body parts with which to make muti, for purposes of witchcraft, still occurs in South Africa. Muti murders occur throughout South Africa, especially in rural areas. Traditional healers or witch doctors often grind up body parts and combine them with roots, herbs, seawater, animal parts, and other ingredients to prepare potions and spells for their clients.

Uganda

In the early 21st century Uganda has experienced a revival of child sacrifice. In spite of government attempts to downplay the issue, an investigation by the BBC into human sacrifice in Uganda found that ritual killings of children are more common than Ugandan authorities admit. There are many indicators that politicians and politically connected wealthy businessmen are involved in sacrificing children in practice of traditional religion, which has become a commercial enterprise.

See also
 Child cannibalism
 Early infanticidal childrearing
 Human sacrifice
 Infanticide
 Religious abuse
 Religious violence

Notes

References

External links

 
 11/04/2008 Child survives sacrifice in Uganda UGPulse.com
 Minoan Child Sacrifice

 
Religion and violence
Gehenna